Thomas Lea was an English footballer who played in the Football League for Accrington.

References

Date of birth unknown
Date of death unknown
English footballers
Association football midfielders
English Football League players
Accrington F.C. players